Manuela Maleeva was the defending champion but lost in the second round to Catarina Lindqvist.

Steffi Graf won in the final 6–0, 6–1 against Nathalie Tauziat.

Seeds
A champion seed is indicated in bold text while text in italics indicates the round in which that seed was eliminated. The top four seeds received a bye to the second round.

  Steffi Graf (champion)
  Manuela Maleeva (second round)
  Helena Suková (semifinals)
  Natasha Zvereva (quarterfinals)
  Katerina Maleeva (semifinals)
  Sylvia Hanika (quarterfinals)
  Larisa Savchenko (first round)
  Stephanie Rehe (quarterfinals)

Draw

Final

Section 1

Section 2

References
 1988 United Jersey Bank Classic Draw

See also
United States Tennis Association

WTA New Jersey
1988 WTA Tour